Chloe Jackson (born August 21, 1996) is an American professional basketball player who is a free agent. She most recently played for the Chicago Sky of the Women’s National Basketball Association. She was drafted by the Sky with the 15th overall pick of the 2019 WNBA draft after playing a successful college basketball career for the Baylor Lady Bears of the Big 12 Conference. She was waived by the Sky in August 2019.

Jackson began her playing career at NC State before transferring to LSU for three years and then to Baylor. She helped guide her team to win the 2019 National Championship and became the NCAA basketball tournament Most Outstanding Player.

WNBA career statistics

Regular season

|-
| align="left" | 2019
| align="left" | Chicago
| 8 || 0 || 4.0 || .222 || .000 || .167 || 0.8 || 0.5 || 0.6 || 0.0 || 0.8 || 0.6
|-
| align="left" | Career
| align="left" | 1 years, 1 team
| 8 || 0 || 4.0 || .222 || .000 || .167 || 0.8 || 0.5 || 0.6 || 0.0 || 0.8 || 0.6

College statistics

Source:

References

1996 births
Living people
American women's basketball players
Basketball players from Washington, D.C.
Basketball players from Maryland
Baylor Bears women's basketball players
Chicago Sky draft picks
Chicago Sky players
Guards (basketball)
LSU Lady Tigers basketball players
NC State Wolfpack women's basketball players
People from Upper Marlboro, Maryland